Charles Joseph Booker (3 June 1865 – 4 June 1925) was a member of the Queensland Legislative Assembly.

Biography
Booker was born in Maryborough, Queensland, the son of Charles Edward Sydney Booker and his wife Margaret (née Shea). He attended Ipswich Grammar School and later on was a Director of Walkers Limited.

In 1891, Booker married Jessie Irene Carter (died 1937) in Sydney and together had one son. He died in Warra in June 1925 and his funeral proceeded from Lumeah, his Graceville residence, to St Matthews Church of England Cemetery.

Public life
After unsuccessfully standing for the two member seat of Maryborough at the 1907 Queensland state elections, Booker won the seat two years later in 1909. Maryborough was reduced to a one-member constituency for the 1912 Queensland state elections and he then won the seat of Wide Bay, holding it until his defeat by Andrew Thompson in 1918.

Booker was also a member of the Perry Shire Council.

References

Members of the Queensland Legislative Assembly
1865 births
1925 deaths